Andriukaitis is a Lithuanian language family name. It may refer to:
Martynas Andriukaitis, Lithuanian basketball player
Vytenis Andriukaitis, Lithuanian heart surgeon and politician
Irena Andriukaitienė, Lithuanian politician

See also
Endriukaitis

Lithuanian-language surnames